Prince Jan Kazimierz Lubomirski (1692–1737) was a Polish szlachcic.

He was starost of Bolimów, owner of Głogów and Robotycze.

References

17th-century births
1736 deaths
Jan Lubomirski